Taft Law School is an unaccredited, for-profit, private, and online law school in Santa Ana, California. It was founded in 1976 and operates through the Taft University System (William Howard Taft University). The school offers Juris Doctor (J.D.) and Master of Laws (LL.M.) law degree programs.

The school is not accredited by the American Bar Association nor by the State Bar of California.  The Law School Admission Council lists Taft Law School as  a "Non-ABA-Approved Law School" and explains that most states do not "permit graduates of these schools to take the bar examination" nor "admit to their bars a graduate of a non-ABA-approved law school."
The California State Bar Committee of Bar Examiners categorizes Taft Law School as a "registered unaccredited correspondence law school." As such, its graduates must pass the First-Year Law Students' Examination (Baby Bar) in order to be eligible to take the California General Bar Examination.

Bar pass rates
In July 2015, 6 graduates took the California Bar Examination for the first time and none passed. In the administration of the same exam 15 graduates were repeat takers, and only one individual passed. In February 2015, a total of 21 graduates took the exam (15 repeat takers) and only 7 passed. In July 2014, 22 graduates took the exam (11 repeat takers) and 3 passed.

Notable people
 ED Denson (J.D., '99), Music industry executive and attorney
 Jonathan Falwell (J.D. '05) – senior pastor at Thomas Road Baptist Church and son of Jerry Falwell
 Jim Rice (J.D.), member of the Idaho Senate
 Orly Taitz (J.D. '02) – lawyer for the birther movement

References

External links
 

Law schools in California
Distance Education Accreditation Commission
Distance education institutions based in the United States
For-profit universities and colleges in the United States
1976 establishments in California
Educational institutions established in 1976
Education in Santa Ana, California
Online law schools in the United States
Unaccredited institutions of higher learning in California